Gun Cay is an island in the Bahamas, located  south of Bimini. Gun Cay lighthouse was established in 1836.

References

Islands of the Bahamas